Siramana Dembélé (born 27 January 1977 in Paris, France), is a French former footballer and current assistant coach for Porto.

In the summer of 2005, Dembélé joined Portuguese side Vitória de Setúbal from Nîmes Olympique, in which he would play for the Sadinos until January 2006 before completing a move to Belgian side Standard Liège.

Honours (as player)
Standard Liège
 Belgian Pro League: 2007–08, 2008–09
 Belgian Super Cup: 2008

Honours (as assistant coach)
Standard Liège
Belgian Cup: 2010–11
Porto
Primeira Liga: 2017–18, 2019–20, 2021–22
Taça de Portugal: 2019–20, 2021–22
Taça da Liga: 2022–23
Supertaça Cândido de Oliveira: 2018, 2020, 2022

References

External links
 

1977 births
Living people
Footballers from Paris
French footballers
Association football midfielders
French sportspeople of Ivorian descent
Championnat National players
Olympique Alès players
AS Cannes players
Nîmes Olympique players
Primeira Liga players
Vitória F.C. players
Belgian Pro League players
Standard Liège players
Israeli Premier League players
Maccabi Petah Tikva F.C. players
French expatriate footballers
Expatriate footballers in Portugal
French expatriate sportspeople in Portugal
Expatriate footballers in Belgium
French expatriate sportspeople in Belgium
Expatriate footballers in Israel
French expatriate sportspeople in Israel
FC Les Lilas players
Standard Liège non-playing staff
FC Nantes non-playing staff
FC Porto non-playing staff